El Heddaf (in Arabic الهدّاف meaning The Scorer) is an Algerian nationwide daily newspaper devoted to football.

Profile
El Haddaf has a French edition named Le Buteur. The paper organizes several events and activities about sports in the country.

The paper's online version  was the fourth most visited website for 2010 in the MENA region.

Arab Footballer of the Year
 2007 :Mohamed Aboutrika
 2008 :Mohamed Aboutrika
 2009 : Madjid Bougherra
 2010 :Mohamed Zidan
 2011 :Adel Taarabt
 2012 :Mohamed Aboutrika
 2013 :Mohamed Salah
 2014 :Yacine Brahimi
 2015 : Mehdi Benatia
2016 - Riyad Mahrez
2017 : Mohamed Salah
2018 : Mohamed Salah

References

External links

Arabic-language newspapers
Newspapers published in Algeria
Sports mass media in Algeria
Publications with year of establishment missing
Sports newspapers